Good Samaritan Hospital in Suffern, NY is a non-profit, 286-bed hospital providing emergency, medical, surgical, obstetrical/gynecological and acute care services to residents of Rockland and southern Orange Counties in New York; and northern Bergen County, New Jersey.  The hospital is home to a cardiovascular program, cancer treatment services, Wound and Hyperbaric Institute and maternal/child services that includes a Children's Diagnostic Center. Good Samaritan Hospital also provides social, psychiatric and substance abuse services and its certified home care agency supports residents of the Hudson Valley and beyond.  Good Samaritan Hospital is a member of the Bon Secours Charity Health System, which also includes St. Anthony Community Hospital in Warwick, New York, and Bon Secours Community Hospital in Port Jervis, New York. The Bon Secours Charity Health System has subsequently become part of the WMCHealth. The hospital currently has a staff of more than 600 doctors and 2000 employees. Its academic affiliate is the New York Medical College School of Medicine.

History
In 1902, Good Samaritan Hospital opened with seven beds, three doctors, seven nurses and four Sisters of Charity, more than enough to serve Suffern's population of 1,800 and small business district consisting of: four hotels, three churches, one school, a lumberyard, an opera house and an assortment of small stores.

A private citizen, said to be Ida Barry Ryan, donated a building at Orange Avenue and East Park Place and $25,000 to the Sisters of Charity of St. Elizabeth to create a hospital. In its first year, the hospital treated 162 patients and was soon forced to expand. During the next ten years, the hospital added an operating room, a pharmacy and X-ray departments.  By 1917, the hospital had 35 beds, nine physicians and three specialists. Maternity services had been available at the hospital from the beginning, but the Spring Valley branch of the Ladies Auxiliary funded the furnishings and equipment for a nursery in 1926 and a maternity ward in 1927.

By 1929, a population increase created an urgent need to build a larger hospital. A committee raised $93,000 and, in 1932, bought  on Lafayette Avenue, the current site of the hospital, for $22,500. The new 72-bed hospital opened on December 14, 1938, and was the first hospital in Rockland County to be fully approved by both the American Medical Association and the American College of Surgeons. In 1939, the hospital won an award as the best-equipped Catholic hospital in the United States and Canada.

When the Tappan Zee Bridge opened in 1955, it brought a large number of new residents to the region and in 1959, Good Samaritan Hospital responded to the need for medical care with the Cardinal Spellman Pavilion. Home Care was founded in 1962 and today has grown into one of the largest home care programs in New York. In 1970, the new Sister Miriam Thomas Pavilion, a five-story, $7 million health facility, was opened, with two 35-bed Medical/surgical floors, a maternal and newborn care center, a laboratory, radiology, a nuclear medicine and cobalt center and a recovery room. The Monsignor Patrick J. Frawley Memorial Psychiatric Unit also opened.

The St. Elizabeth Ann Seton Critical Care Center was completed in 1980, and the Frank and Fannie Weiss Renal Dialysis Center was opened in 1982. An $85 million building and renovation project included the construction of a cardiac catheterization laboratory and expansion of the radiology, laboratory and rehab services departments. In the late 1980s and early 1990s, the hospital added: a 28-bed chemical and alcohol dependency outpatient program, a children's diagnostic center, single-room maternity units and a neonatal intermediate care nursery (NICU-level), and brachytherapy in radiation oncology services.

In 1996, Good Samaritan Hospital and its sponsors, the Sisters of Charity of St. Elizabeth, joined the Franciscan Sisters of the Poor, the Sisters of Mercy and the Franciscan Health System to form the Tri-State Health System. The Emergency Department earned a Level II trauma services designation in 1997. In January 2000, Good Samaritan Hospital and the Sisters of Charity entered into a co-sponsorship with the Sisters of Bon Secours, creating Bon Secours Charity Health System. In the fall, the hospital unveiled the Union State Bank Family Birthing Center and added a full-time maternity consultant.

Cardiac Services in Rockland County
The hospital was approved to begin performing angioplasties in 2003, but it was clear that the hospital's service area needed more. In 2005, the first major step in remedying this situation was taken when the New York State Hospital Review and Planning Council recommended granting approval of Good Samaritan Hospital's Certificate of Need (CON) application for an adult cardiac surgery program. Also in 2005, Good Samaritan Hospital became the first hospital in the country to earn Disease Specific Care Certification for the management of acute myocardial infarction. The Stroke Center at Good Samaritan Regional Medical Center is also recognized as a Primary Stroke Center by the New York State Department of Health. Good Samaritan Hospital was the first hospital in New York State to earn both "The Joint Commission" Primary Stroke Center certification, along with state designation as a Primary Stroke Center.

In 2007, the hard work of the previous two years was realized when the hospital performed its first open heart surgery, which marked
Only one month previously, the hospital was once again recognized with the Gold Seal of Approval for both the Management of Acute Myocardial Infarction (heart attack) and Management of Stroke from the Joint Commission on Accreditation of Healthcare Organizations (JCAHO).

References

Hospital buildings completed in 1938
Hospital buildings completed in 1980
Buildings and structures in Rockland County, New York
Hospitals established in 1902
Hospitals in New York (state)
Ramapos
Catholic hospitals in North America
Catholic health care